Bottoms is a 2023 American teen sex comedy film directed by Emma Seligman from a screenplay by Seligman and Rachel Sennott, who also stars opposite Ayo Edebiri. The film is produced by Elizabeth Banks under her Brownstone Productions banner. Its plot follows two high school senior girls who set up a fight club as a guise to hook up with cheerleaders. Ruby Cruz, Havana Rose Liu, Kaia Gerber, Nicholas Galitzine and Marshawn Lynch appear in supporting roles.      

Bottoms headlined the 2023 SXSW film festival on March 11, 2023, where it received critical acclaim for its humor, characters, and satirical elements. It will be distributed by Orion Pictures through Metro-Goldwyn-Mayer in the United States.

Synopsis
Two high school senior girls set up a "fight club" to hook up with cheerleaders before graduation.

Cast

Rachel Sennott as PJ
Ayo Edebiri as Josie
Marshawn Lynch as Mr. G
Havana Rose Liu as Isabel
Kaia Gerber as Brittany
Nicholas Galitzine as Jeff
Ruby Cruz as Hazel
Dagmara Dominczyk
Miles Fowler as Tim
Punkie Johnson
Lacey Dover
Alyssa Matthews
Krystal Chambers
Summer Joy Campbell

Production
In April 2021 it was announced that Seligman and Sennott were working with Orion Pictures and Brownstone Productions with Elizabeth Banks and Max Handelman, and Alison Small  producing for Brownstone, with Alana Mayo for Orion. It is the second collaboration between Seligman and Sennott after 2020’s Shiva Baby. Whilst promoting that film Seligman described her next project as a "campy queer high school comedy in the vein of Wet Hot American Summer but more for a Gen-Z queer audience." In April 2022, it was announced that Ayo Edebiri, Marshawn Lynch, Ruby Cruz, Havana Rose Liu, Kaia Gerber, Nicholas Galitzine, Miles Fowler, Dagmara Dominczyk and Punkie Johnson were added to the cast. Filming was scheduled to take place in New Orleans between April 18 and May 27, 2022. On September 12, 2022 it was confirmed by The New York Times that filming had wrapped and Sennott described the film as “two girls in a classic American football town who start a fight club under the guise of female empowerment, but it’s actually so they can have sex with cheerleaders.”

Release
Bottoms premiered at the SXSW film festival on March 11, 2023. It is set to be theatrically released by Metro-Goldwyn-Mayer.

Reception
On the review aggregator website Rotten Tomatoes, Bottoms has an approval rating of 93%, based on 15 reviews with an average rating of 8.5/10.

Reviewing the film for Variety, following its premiere at South by Southwest, Owen Gleiberman commended the direction and screenplay (particularly its characters and humor), stating: "Bottoms is unlike any high-school comedy you’ve ever seen. It’s a satire of victimization, a satire of violence, and a satire of itself. It walks a tightrope between sensitivity and insanity (with a knowing bit of inanity), and it’s full of moments that are defiantly what we once used to call incorrect". Valerie Complex of Deadline admired the lead performances and Seligman's direction, but found some faults with the screenplay, ultimately concluding: "Bottoms is fun, but not with some slight tweaks this could have an epic exploration of the gray areas of queerness and what it means to stand in the center of that as an adolescent". Referring to the film as the "horniest, bloodiest high school movie of the 21st century" in an highly enthusiastic review for Rolling Stone, David Fear lauded every aspect of the film, including its direction, screenplay and cast performances.

References

External links
 

2020s comedy films
2020s LGBT-related films
2020s English-language films
American coming-of-age comedy films
American high school films
American LGBT-related films
Bisexuality-related films
Casual sex in films
Female bisexuality in film
LGBT-related comedy films
Metro-Goldwyn-Mayer films
Orion Pictures films
2020s American films